Platteweg is a hamlet in the Dutch province of South Holland. It is a part of the former municipality of Reeuwijk, and lies about 2.3 km east of Gouda.

The statistical area "Platteweg", which also can include the surrounding countryside, has a population of around 180.

References

Bodegraven-Reeuwijk
Populated places in South Holland